Dunluce may refer to:

 Dunluce Castle, Northern Ireland
 Dunluce (1921), an orchestral tone poem by Edward Norman Hay, inspired by Dunluce Castle
 Dunluce, County Antrim, a parish and a townland in County Antrim, Northern Ireland
 Dunluce Lower, a barony in County Antrim, Northern Ireland
 Dunluce Upper, a barony in County Antrim, Northern Ireland
Dunluce, Ballure Road, Ramsey, Isle of Man, one of Isle of Man's Registered Buildings
 Dunluce (Edmonton), a neighbourhood in Edmonton, Canada

Poem

See also
 Viscount Dunluce, a title in the Peerage of Ireland